Samuel ben Uri Shraga Phoebus (alternatively, "Or Shraga", "Faivish", "Fayvish", "Faibesh", etc.) (Hebrew: שמואל בן אורי שרגא פיביש) was a Polish rabbi and Talmudist of Woydyslaw in the second half of the 17th century. In his early youth he was a pupil of Rabbi Heshel in Cracow, and on the latter's death he continued his studies under R. Heshel's successor, Rabbi Leib Fischeles, whose daughter he married.

Samuel officiated as rabbi in Shydlow, Poland, whence he was called in September 1691 to the rabbinate of Fürth, Germany. In his new office he displayed great activity, and was the recipient of a good income; nevertheless his new surroundings were distasteful to him. The reason is not known; but it is recorded that he longed for his former rabbinate. In 1694 he received a call to return to Shydlow, which he soon accepted, as appears from his approbation of the work Ir Binyamin (Frankfort-on-the-Oder, 1698), in which he is mentioned as rabbi of the Polish town.

Samuel wrote in Hebrew a clear and comprehensive commentary, known as Beit Shmuel, on the Shulhan Aruk, Eben ha'Ezer, which appeared in Dyhernfurth in 1689, being the first Hebrew work printed there. Later he thoroughly revised it; and a second edition, with several emendations and additions, appeared at Fürth in 1694. He wrote also several responsa and opinions, one of which is published in Ḥinnuk Bet Yehudah, No. 131 (Frankfort-on-the-Main, 1705).

His daughter married R. Aaron Hart, the chief rabbi of the United Kingdom.

References

17th-century Polish rabbis
People from Fürth
17th-century German rabbis
Year of death unknown
Year of birth unknown
Authors of books on Jewish law